is a Japanese seinen yonkoma manga series by Satoko Kiyuzuki. The series was serialized in Heiwa Shuppan's moe four-panel manga magazine Comic Gyutto! from its first issue on July 23, 2004 to its last issue (the third issue). Afterwards a one-shot manga appeared in the August 2005 issue of Houbunsha's seinen manga magazine, Manga Time Kirara Carat, and started regular serialization from the November 2005 issue to the December 2015 issue. Yen Press announced at Comic Con 2008 that it had acquired a license for English-language distribution of GA Geijutsuka Art Design Class in North America. A 12-episode anime adaptation aired in Japan between July and September 2009.

Summary
Five girls—Kisaragi, Miyabi, Tomokane, Namiko, and Miki—are in the GA Art Design Class at Ayanoi Academy where they learn graphic design, art techniques and other subjects. The story follows their day-to-day lives and the activities of some the teachers and Art Club members of the academy.

Characters

Main characters

A student in the GA-1 class. With over-sized glasses that reflect her clumsy tendency, she has a gentle personality. She is gullible, buying pencils that was supposedly used by the "God of Studies", Sugawara no Michizane, from over 1100 years ago. Unfortunately, her personality makes her an easy target for Noda and Tomokane's jokes. She finds natural/plain-coloured cats (Suneko 素猫) irresistible, evident through her constant doodling of them in her sketchbook. Yamaguchi loves painting and works very hard to improve, but to her dismay, her artworks often get destroyed by Tomokane and Noda. However, she still cares deeply for her friends as she was very worried when Nozaki was sick. Her favorite style of fashion is revealed to be kimonos.

A student in the GA-1 class. Cute and small, Noda often gets mistaken for a grade school girl. As a result, she wears her high school uniform with pride. Nozaki calls her "Hime" (princess) because she acts spoiled at times. She gets easily bored and often comes up with interesting ideas to spice things up. For instance, she turned a normal lunch into a game where everyone drew lottery and had to follow the rule written on there. Nicknamed "Alchemist", she also enjoys mixing a variety of things, including drinks. Extremely talented and motivated in her studies, she is also shown to be very moody, which does seem to affect her work. Her hobby is fashion and spends an average of eight minutes on each page in a fashion magazine. Noda is usually seen with a different hairstyle every time, indicative of her love for fashion. She is able to have an "insight" into what a person is wearing and immediately able to tell its origins. She has a sister in the third year.

A student in the GA-1 class. She is the tomboy of the group and always gets herself in trouble due to her explosive temperament. Her personality seems to be influenced by her years of frustration over her brother. He never lets her win in a game of wit and because he has a weak constitution, she is unable to do anything to him physically. She likes to do things through brute force, for example, using her grip power to draw different shades, instead of different pencils. Although her techniques and methods are normally quite blunt, she is shown to have incredible talent. However, she has a habit of destroying artworks, particularly those of Yamaguchi. She teams up with Noda for many hilarious situations and jokes.

A student in the GA-1 class. Nicknamed  by her friends due to her intelligence, she has excellent grades and teaches her friends many art concepts. Although she rarely smiles, she is shown to be incredibly reliable, able to pull out anything her friends need from inside her jacket. Adding to her mysterious character is her strange "powers", like natural magnetism or the ability to control animals. Despite her stoic mannerisms, she is still quite playful and likes to be with her friends. Although she is very popular among the other classes, she has yet to find a boyfriend, but claims that her parents have already picked out a fiance for her. She addresses everyone in a very samurai-formal, but awkward (in the modern Japanese context) manner by attaching "-dono" in place of "-san". Her favorite color is black and it frequently appears in her artwork.

A student in the GA-1 class. Tall and well endowed, Nozaki is the oldest of the girls. She unintentionally acts as the "mother/older sister" figure for the other girls (more towards Kisaragi to her clumsy nature), always prone to help or scold them. There is a running gag where she gets called "Okaa-san" or "Onee-san" and dislikes it. She especially likes to tease Noda and sometimes calls her "Hime" (princess) due to her behavior. Evident early in the anime, she lacks the ability to make jokes, but is quick to criticize other jokes. She has a sister that has already graduated from the GA class.

Art Club Members

An energetic and playful student in the GA-3 class. She is also the president of the Fine Arts club. She frequently takes out her rage on her juniors and the equipment. Her personality is very eccentric but seems to be well liked, most likely because of her Chubu accent that many people mistake for Kansai dialect. Awara is best friends with Mizubuchi, who she calls "Buchi-san".

A mature student in the GA-3 class. She is a childhood friend of Kisaragi Yamaguchi and the guardian of Chikako Awara. Mizubuchi is the one who introduces Yamaguchi to Ayanoi Gakuen. Over the years, Mizubuchi has learned how to deal with Awara's eccentric personality effectively. She is best friends with Awara, who she calls "Aa-san".

A student of the FA-3 normal class. He is also the vice president of the Fine Arts club.

A student of the KJ-2 car maintenance class. He is usually the target of Awara's rage.
Tomokane's older brother

A student in the GA-2 class and the newest member of the Fine Arts club. He has a weak constitution, which caused him to miss most of his first year. He joined the club after participating in the haunted house club event. Though outwardly well mannered, he actually enjoys playing tricks on people.

Teachers

The teacher responsible for the GA-1 class. Sotoma can be very strict, often making his students redo assignments. However, he is still well respected by the students.

An alumna of the school who works as an assistant homeroom teacher to Sotoma. She is a beautiful and hardworking teacher, but can sometimes be very childish, evident through her behavior during the blood drive. Some of her students call her "Samechan-sensei" because during her first year teaching, she stuttered while stating her name and said "Usame" instead of "Usami". She enjoys teaching very much. She is also scared very easily. Usami may have romantic feelings towards Sotoma, as she secretly made copies of his students' work depicting him and her as a romantic couple.

The teacher responsible for the GA-3 class. Her appearance is tomboyish and has a stoic personality. Preferring to work quietly, she has agreed to be the advisor to two clubs, Fine Arts club and School Life Environment club (which later combine into one due to lack of members). Known as "Tono-sensei" by the club members, Sasamoto admits that she only agreed to be the advisor so she can use the club room freely. Therefore, she has almost no responsibility, frequently skipping the club sessions to go smoking.

 (OVA)
A strict and old teacher that specializes in fashion. Kisaragi is afraid of this teacher because she tends to yell at her students.

Others

A student in the GA-1 class. She and Oomichi won awards for their art and had it displayed at the local prefecture art exhibit.

The original president of the Fine Arts club when Awara was still a first-year.  In Volume 5 of the manga series, this is confirmed to be Namiko's older sister, who had already graduated.
Noda's older sister
A student in the FA-3 normal class. She sometimes appears in a fashion magazine so she is very popular at Ayanoi Gakuen (though her face is never seen.)

A student in the GA-3 class.
Marianne Van Tienen
A transfer student from France, who appears in Volume 4 of the manga series. She tries to create a trendy, yet traditional, kimono during her time in GA.
Natsuki Hata
A middle school student Kisaragi and Noda meet when taking refuge from the rain in Volume 5 of the manga. She draws in a "hideout" under an overpass, as her mother opposes her drawing at home.

Media

Manga

Volume list

Anime
A 12-episode anime television series adaptation produced by AIC and directed by Hiroaki Sakurai aired in Japanese between July 6 and September 21, 2009, on Yomiuri TV.

Game
A PSP game published and developed by Russell was released on July 29, 2010 under the name GA: Geijutsuka Art Design Class -Slapstick Wonderland-. The game was released on both limited and regular editions. Characters from the series appear alongside other Manga Time Kirara characters in the 2019 mobile RPG, Kirara Fantasia.

References

External links
 Anime official website 
 Mania.com review of vol. 1
 
 

2004 manga
2009 Japanese television series endings
Anime International Company
Anime series based on manga
Comedy anime and manga
Houbunsha manga
School life in anime and manga
Seinen manga
Slice of life anime and manga
Yen Press titles
Yomiuri Telecasting Corporation original programming
Yonkoma
Art in anime and manga